The 1983 Los Angeles Rams season was the team's 46th year with the National Football League and the 38th season in the city of Los Angeles. The franchise drafted a future Hall of Fame Running Back in Eric Dickerson. The season saw the team attempt to improve on its 2–7 record from 1982. The team started out 5–2 before splitting their next 4 games and then lost at home to Washington to sit at 7–5. They would split their last 4 games to finish 9–7 and make the playoffs for the first time since 1980 after a 2-year absence. In the playoffs, they defeated the Cowboys 24–17 in Dallas to advance to the Divisional Round. However, in the game, the Rams were annihilated 51–7 by the Redskins, who would move on to the Super Bowl, only to lose to the other Los Angeles NFL team, the Los Angeles Raiders, 38–9.

Offseason

NFL Draft

Personnel

Staff

Roster

Regular season

Eric Dickerson 
While he considered going to the Los Angeles Express in the United States Football League, Dickerson decided to go into the National Football League at the advice of his mother because the NFL had been around longer. He was selected second overall in the 1983 NFL Draft by the Los Angeles Rams. An immediate pro success, he established rookie records for most rushing attempts (390), most rushing yards gained (1,808) and most touchdowns rushing (18), including another two receiving touchdowns. His efforts earned him All-Pro, Pro Bowl, Player of the Year and Rookie of the Year honors.

Schedule

September 25, 1983

Week 4: Los Angeles Rams 24, New York Jets 27

Playoffs

December 26, 1983

NFC: Los Angeles Rams 24, Dallas Cowboys 17

January 1, 1984

NFC: Washington Redskins 51, Los Angeles Rams 7

Standings

Awards and honors 
 Eric Dickerson, NFC Pro Bowl selection
 Eric Dickerson, All-Pro selection
 Eric Dickerson, NFL Offensive Rookie of the Year
 Eric Dickerson, UPI NFL-NFC Rookie of the Year
 Eric Dickerson, UPI NFC Player of the Year

See also 
Other Anaheim–based teams in 1983
 California Angels (Anaheim Stadium)
 1983 California Angels season

References

External links 
 1983 Los Angeles Rams at Pro-Football-Reference.com

Los Angeles Rams
Los Angeles Rams seasons
Los Ang